Robert A. "Bob" Madigan (November 28, 1942 – May 4, 2006) was an American politician.

Born in Lincoln, Illinois, Madigan received his bachelor's degree from Millikin University. His brother was Edward Rell Madigan. Madigan served as city clerk of Lincoln, Illinois. From 1987 to 2001, Madigan served in the Illinois State Senate as a Republican. He was then appointed to the Illinois Industrial Commission. He died in Lincoln, Illinois.

Notes

1942 births
2006 deaths
People from Lincoln, Illinois
Millikin University alumni
Republican Party Illinois state senators
20th-century American politicians